Saint Peter's University Hospital (SPUH) is a Roman Catholic hospital on Easton Avenue in New Brunswick, New Jersey. The hospital is a member of the Saint Peter's Healthcare System, Inc., a New Jersey nonprofit corporation sponsored by the Roman Catholic Diocese of Metuchen.

Overview
Saint Peter's University Hospital is a non-profit, 478-licensed-bed acute care teaching hospital. Saint Peter's has been designated by the state of New Jersey as a Specialty Acute Care Children's Hospital, Regional Perinatal Center, and Stroke Center that operates one of the largest maternity services in New Jersey and in the country.

The hospital is a major clinical affiliate of Rutgers Biomedical and Health Sciences, providing full-time training to as many as 60 students in their third or fourth years of medical school, and has a clinical affiliation with The Children's Hospital of Philadelphia.

History
Saint Peter's University Hospital opened in 1907 as a 25-bed hospital on Somerset and Hardenburgh streets in New Brunswick. Saint Peter's moved to its current location at 254 Easton Avenue in New Brunswick in 1929 as a 125-bed facility. In 1959, a three-wing 349-bed addition was constructed. In 1976, a five-story tower containing the emergency department, radiology department, operating and recovery suite, and a 40-bed nursing unit was completed. In 1991, The Women and Children's Pavilion was added. In 1999 the Center for Ambulatory Resources (CARES) building was constructed. New Telemetry, Maternity and Oncology units were completed in 2008.

In late 2019, it was announced that the leaders of RWJBarnabas Health and the leaders of Saint Peter's Healthcare System signed a letter of intent to explore a merger. The preliminary plan calls for significant investments in Saint Peter's by RWJBarnabas Health to help expand the outpatient services currently provided by Saint Peter's. Saint Peter's would remain a Catholic hospital and continue its sponsorship by the Roman Catholic Diocese of Metuchen. According to administrations from both hospitals, the two parties have been in discussions for a while and believe they could both benefit from the merger. The merger would also strengthen education services provided at the two already Rutgers affiliated hospitals.

On September 10, 2020, it was announced that the health systems had signed a definitive agreement that the two systems would merge. The merger would create the largest academic medical center in the state. After the signing of the agreement, the potential partnership began a period of review by state and federal regulatory agencies. The Federal Trade Commission announced on June 2, 2022, that they are suing to block the merger.

Awards and honors
1998, 2002, 2006, 2011, 2020 Magnet Recognition for Nursing Excellence, designated four terms in a row.

See also
Saint Peter's University

References

External links
Official website

Hospital buildings completed in 1907
Hospital buildings completed in 1929
Hospital buildings completed in 1959
Catholic hospitals in North America
Teaching hospitals in New Jersey
Rutgers University
Buildings and structures in New Brunswick, New Jersey
Hospitals established in 1907
1907 establishments in New Jersey
Catholic health care